The Broken Violin may refer to:
The Broken Violin (1908 film), a silent French film by Georges Méliès

The Broken Violin (1923 film) an American silent film directed by John Francis Dillon
The Broken Violin (1928 film), an American film by Oscar Micheaux

See also
 Tsubrokhene fidl ('Broken fiddle' or 'Broken violin'), a 1918 composition by Joseph Rumshinsky